Altererythrobacter aquiaggeris  is a Gram-negative and non-motile bacterium from the genus of Altererythrobacter which has been isolated from water from the Geumgang Estuary Bank in Korea.

References 

Sphingomonadales
Bacteria described in 2017